Greg Iles (born 1960) is a novelist who lives in Mississippi. He has published seventeen novels and one novella, spanning a variety of genres.

Early life
Iles was born in 1960 in Stuttgart, West Germany, where his physician father ran the US Embassy Medical Clinic. He was raised in Natchez, Mississippi, the setting of many of his novels. After attending Trinity Episcopal Day School, he graduated from the University of Mississippi in 1983.

Career
Iles spent several years as a guitarist, singer, and songwriter in the band Frankly Scarlet.  He quit the band after he was married and began working on his first novel, Spandau Phoenix, a thriller about Nazi war criminal Rudolf Hess. Spandau Phoenix was published in 1993.

In 2002, Iles wrote the screenplay 24 Hours from his novel of the same name. Rewritten by director Don Roos, it was renamed Trapped. Iles then rewrote the script during the shoot, at the request of the producers and actors.

In 2011, Iles was seriously injured in a traffic accident on U.S. Route 61 near Natchez. He sustained life-threatening injuries, including a ruptured aorta. He was put into an induced coma for eight days, and lost his right leg below the knee. During his three-year recovery, he wrote three volumes of a trilogy set in Natchez, Mississippi, and featuring former prosecutor Penn Cage.

Iles is a member of the literary musical group The Rock Bottom Remainders, which includes or has included authors Dave Barry, Ridley Pearson, Stephen King, Scott Turow, Amy Tan, Mitch Albom, Roy Blount, Jr., Matt Groening, and James McBride. In July 2013,  he co-authored Hard Listening (2013) with the group.  The ebook combines essays, fiction, musings, email exchanges and conversations, photographs, audio and video clips, and interactive quizzes to give readers a view into the private lives of the authors/musicians.

Works

Fiction 
 Spandau Phoenix (1993) 
 Black Cross (1995) 
 Mortal Fear (1997) 
 The Quiet Game (1999) 
 24 Hours (2000) 
 Dead Sleep (2001) 
 Sleep No More (2002) 
 The Footprints of God (2003) (also titled Dark Matter)  
 Blood Memory (2005) 
 Turning Angel (2005) 
 True Evil (2006) 
 Third Degree (2007)
 The Devil's Punchbowl (2009) 
 The Death Factory (2014) novella
 Natchez Burning (2014)
 The Bone Tree  (2015)
 Mississippi Blood (2017)
 Cemetery Road (2019)
 Southern Man (2024)

Nonfiction 
 Hard Listening (2013), with Rock Bottom Remainders

References

External links

The Official Website of Greg Iles

1960 births
Living people
20th-century American novelists
21st-century American novelists
American male novelists
American thriller writers
Novelists from Mississippi
University of Mississippi alumni
People from Natchez, Mississippi
Writers from Stuttgart
Rock Bottom Remainders members
20th-century American male writers
21st-century American male writers
Barry Award winners